Large multinational corporations want to streamline their banking practices. To do this, they need all of their bank billing electronically, and in a common format.

Corporations do not know with any degree of accuracy what is being paid to international banks for their services. Main concerns were:

 No way of accurately verifying international bank fees.
 Analysis of bank fees is labor-intensive.
 No way to provide management with global bank relationship metrics.
 International cash management fees are decentralised with few controls in place.
 Compliance issues, like Sarbanes-Oxley Act.
Normally billing in banking has following aspects.
 It must be periodic (at pre agreed duration...).
 Details of the transaction must contain ref no. of client.
 It also covers statutory payment details if any.
 Format can be customised as per the client's requirements.
 Mode of presentation can also be selected per clients selection (fax, mail, hard copy...).
 Grouping of services done at various levels.
 Tracking of repayment.
 Reconciliation for repayment.

The BSB Standard
Bank Services Billing (BSB) is an industry standard that governs the format of electronic bills send out by financial institutions to wholesale customers (e.g. corporations, governments, institutions). BSB is a statement to report on the corporate customers' usage of financial services and their related charges. It takes the form of a periodic electronic statement that lists all the chargeable service events that occurred during a reporting cycle, along with detailed tax and currency information. This standard is developed by TWIST, a not-for-profit industry group delivering open, XML-based, standards in certain financial processes.

The main idea behind this standard is to "obtain an electronic billing statement from international banks in a standard format".

According to TWIST, Denmark's Danske Bank has become the first European bank to use its bank billing standard to deliver detailed information to corporate treasurers and wholesale clients. The bank is using the Twist BSB standard for the electronic transmission of information relating to bank charges to General Electric (GE).

References

Banking